Jiří Dejl is a Czechoslovak retired slalom canoeist who competed in the 1960s. He won two silver medals at the ICF Canoe Slalom World Championships, earning them in 1965 (C-2) and 1969 (C-2 team).

References

Czechoslovak male canoeists
Living people
Year of birth missing (living people)
Medalists at the ICF Canoe Slalom World Championships